Zərdab  may refer to:
Zardab Rayon, Azerbaijan
Zardab (city), Azerbaijan
Zərdab, Agsu, Azerbaijan